There are at least 450,000 freshwater lakes in Norway. Most were created by glacial erosion.

Types of lakes

Various Sami and Norwegian language terms distinguish different types of lake, and often feature in place names:
 Fjord: Although normally used to describe a saltwater inlet, in eastern Norway a long, narrow fresh water lake is also called a fjord (though this differs from the English use of the word: see fjord). Randsfjorden, mapped on the left, is the largest example of an inland fjord.
 Sjø: Although normally used to describe a sea, Sjø is also a large fresh-water lake that is not as narrow as a fjord. Examples include Vansjø in Østfold and Selbusjø in Sør-Trøndelag.
 Mjøs: The form mjøs is also used for larger lakes. Mjøsa itself is a large lake between the towns of Gjøvik, Lillehammer and Hamar. Other examples of the usage include Vangsmjøse in Vang, Oppland.
 Vatn: A vatn (or vann) is a small lake. You can walk around a vatn in a couple of hours. Sognsvann near Oslo is one example of such usage. Vatn might be used for large lakes further north, such as Altevatnet in Troms and Snåsavatnet in Nord-Trøndelag.
 Tjern: (from the old Norse tjarn and tjǫrn) is a small lake. It is also written tjenn, tjørn and tjønn. The English cognate is tarn.
 Combinations: Østensjøvannet is an interesting variation that concatenates sjø and vann. Møsvann in Vinje, Telemark combines mjøsa with vann.
 Jávrásj: (Lule Sami, spoken in Nordland) or Jávrrás (Northern Sami, more widespread):  Where the place names of the Sami people are used, these are limited to very small lakes, or ponds. None are listed here.
 Jávrre: (Lule Sami) or jávri (Northern Sami): These refer to larger lakes. The largest lake in Norway predominantly known by its Sami name is Siiddašjávri, which lies partly in Nordland but mostly in Sweden. Vuolep Sårjåsjávrre, also straddling the Nordland-Sweden border, is the largest with the Lule Sam ending -jávrre.
 Luoppal: (North Sámi) is a narrow lake with one river running into it, one river running out from it. May be difficult to distinguish from a temporary widening of a river.

Largest lakes

The following list shows the top ten lakes in Norway in terms of surface area.

Deepest lakes
Europe's four deepest lakes are in Norway, namely Hornindalsvatnet, Salvatnet, Lake Tinn and Mjøsa. The following list ranks the top ten lakes in Norway in terms of depth.

*  Sources provide both 464 m & 482 m for the greatest depth.

See also

Geography of Norway

References

 

es:Anexo:Lagos de Noruega